Aeroflot Flight 120 was an international Soviet passenger flight from Kabul International Airport in Afghanistan to Tashkent International Airport in the Uzbek SSR. On 13 December 1959 the Aeroflot Ilyushin Il-14P operating the flight crashed in the Boysun District killing all 25 passengers and 5 crew on board.

Aircraft 
The Il-14P aircraft was released by the Moscow Banner of Labor plant on 17 May 1957, with a serial number of 147001416. After release, it was sold to the General Directorate of the civil air fleet. The airliner received the tail number СССР-Л1577 and was sent to the 160th Tashkent air transport detachment of the Uzbek territorial administration. In 1959, the onboard number was changed to CCCP-91577 due to re-registration. The aircraft had 3,029 total flight hours at the time of crash.

Passengers and crew 

Pilot – Anatoly Nikolaevich Vishnyakov
First officer – Vasily Alekseevich Miroshnichenko
Flight engineer – Vasily Vasilyevich Svyatkin
Radio operator – Nikolai Polikarpovich Razumov

Accident 
The plane operated as Aeroflot Flight 120 from Kabul (the Kingdom of Afghanistan) to Tashkent (Uzbekistan) with a stopover in Termez. At 09:02 MSK, flight 120 with 25 passengers and 5 crew members on board departed from Termez airport to Tashkent. According to the weather forecast, the route was expected to have stratocumulus clouds with individual breaks and a lower boundary of 2,000–2,500 meters, cumulus clouds with a lower boundary of 300–500 meters, snowfall with a visibility about 4–10 kilometers, and mountains covered with clouds. The airliner climbed to 3,600 meters and headed north. At 09:27 the crew reported their position over Derbent. It was the last radio message from flight 120. A minute later, at 09:28, the plane disappeared from the controllers radar as it entered the mountains. The crew did not respond to the calls any longer and did not arrive in Tashkent. Searches were conducted within the month, but were unsuccessful. On 19 January 1960, only 37 days later, the Soviet Embassy in Kabul officially announced the disappearance of the Flight 120.

Six months later, on 2 June 1960, an Mi-1 helicopter registered СССР-66912 flew over the Baysuntau Range, when its crew saw fragments of an aircraft on the southeast slope of Mount Kushtang, 27 kilometers northeast of Baysun. The search service that later arrived at the site discovered that the crashed aircraft was flight 120. It was determined that the aircraft was flying at an altitude of 3,700 meters and at a bank angle of 45-60° when the left wing, then the fuselage impacted the sheer mountain slope. The wreckage rolled two hundred meters down to the base of the slope at 3,501 meters. All 30 people on board died. At that time, it was the largest crash of the Il-14 aircraft and the second largest plane crash in Uzbekistan.

Cause 
After departing from Termez, the crew did not follow the established route, but instead flew directly through Derbent and mountains to Tashkent. This was determined to be the main cause of the disaster. At the same time, the crew did not take into account the actual wind, which caused the plane to divert from the chosen path towards the mountains, after which it flew into the clouds around these mountains and then crashed into them.

During the investigation, the commission found various irregularities in the provision of air transportation in the region. Pilots were flying straight through mountain ranges and diverting from the established route. Air traffic controllers at the same time poorly monitored flights through existing equipment and did not try to return the aircraft back to its route. Also, in the case of the crash of flight 120, the visual flight rules were violated, as the flight took place in a mountainous area in conditions of overcast and closed mountain peaks.

References 

Aviation accidents and incidents involving controlled flight into terrain
Surxondaryo Region
December 1959 events in Asia
Aviation accidents and incidents in 1959
Accidents and incidents involving the Ilyushin Il-14
Aviation accidents and incidents in the Soviet Union
120
1959 in the Soviet Union
Aviation accidents and incidents caused by pilot error